Title 54 of the United States Code (54 U.S.C.), entitled National Park Service and Related Programs, is the compilation of the general laws regarding the National Park Service. It is the newest title in the United States Code, added on December 19, 2014, when U.S. President Barack Obama signed  into law. It has three subtitles:
 Subtitle I: National Park System
 Subtitle II: Outdoor Recreation Programs
 Subtitle III: National Preservation Programs

History 
It consists of laws previously codified in Title 16 (Conservation).

 was introduced on March 12, 2013, and referred to the Committee on the Judiciary of the House of Representatives. The bill was reported by the Committee on April 19, 2013, and passed by the House of Representatives on April 23, 2013. No further action was taken for more than a year, until the bill passed in the Senate by unanimous consent on December 15, 2014, and was signed into law by President Obama on December 19.

References 

 Title 54, United States Code, National Park System, (History) via Office of the Law Revision Counsel
U.S. Code Title 54, via Cornell University

54
National Park Service